The Corcoran 65-1 was a motor glider of very unusual configuration, a twin engine biplane.  It was designed and built in the United States in the 1960s; only two were completed.

Design and development

Since World War I almost all gliders have been monoplanes and almost all motor gliders have had a single engine.  The Corcoran 65-1 is one of very few twin engine biplane motor glider designs.

The 65-1 had straight tapered, square tipped wings of equal span. Each was built around a single spar and skinned with aluminium. It was a single bay biplane with, on each side, a single, faired vertical interplane strut and a long bracing strut from the lower fuselage to the upper wing near the top of the interplane strut.  The ailerons, fitted on piano hinges on both upper and lower wings, were made of aluminium and unbalanced.  Flaps were carried on the upper wing only, filling 60% of its span.  They had four positions, with a maximum deflection of 35°.

The flat sided, rectangular cross-section fuselage was aluminium framed and skinned.  Its cockpit was enclosed by a single frame canopy, hinged on the port side. Behind the cockpit there was an extended fairing, starting at canopy height and tapering away just behind the wing trailing edge. A short, thin, streamlined pylon reached above it to support the upper wing centre section.  Two 8 hp (6 kW) West Bend 82 go-kart engines were mounted behind the fairing on short struts, driving pusher propellers.  Fin and rudder were straight tapered and square topped, with the latter extending down to the keel. The constant chord, square tipped tailplane was mounted on top of the fuselage and carried separated elevators, cut away inboard to permit rudder movement. The landing gear comprised a monowheel, fixed but partially faired, a steerable tailwheel and two small balancing outrigger wheels on short, faired struts below the interplane struts.

The 65-1 flew for the first time in October 1965.  It was followed by a second prototype which was significantly modified by an increase in wing area of 80% and by moving the previously external engines to within the fuselage, at the same fuselage position as before. The propellers were mounted on outriggers and belt driven.

Specifications (first prototype)

Notes

References

1960s United States sailplanes
Biplanes
Aircraft first flown in 1965
Motor gliders
Twin-engined pusher aircraft